Quickie may refer to:

 Quickie (sexual act), a brief or spontaneous episode of sexual activity
 Quickie (divorce), a divorce obtained in a jurisdiction with few requirements

Arts and entertainment
 The Quickie (film), a 2001 crime film
 The 8TV Quickie, a 15-minute variety show
 The Quickie (novel), a novel by James Patterson
 "Quickie" (song), a 2011 song by Miguel
 Quickies (album), a 2020 album by The Magnetic Fields

Brands
 Quickie Convenience Stores, an Ottawa-based grocery chain
 Quickie Aircraft, an aircraft manufacturer of the United States
 Rutan Quickie, a light single seat homebuilt aircraft

People
 Vincent Van Quickenborne (born 1973), Belgian politician with that nickname
 "Quickie", common nickname of Donald Driver, American football player

Other uses
 Quickie (joke), a short joke that is used between segments on the children's television series, Garfield and Friends
 Daily Quickie, a former column on ESPN.com by Dan Shanoff

See also
Quicky, rabbit mascot of Nesquik
Qwiki
CWCki, pronounced "Quickie"